RRH is the human gene that encodes the visual pigment-like receptor Peropsin.

RRH may also refer to:

 Rrh (trigraph)
 Remote Radar Head, a network of sites used by the British RAF
 Remote radio head, a type of radio used in wireless telecommunications networks
 Regesta Regni Hierosolymitani, an 1893 history of the Crusades by Reinhold Röhricht